Mauro Machado da Silva (born 22 January 1975 in Porto Alegre, Brazil) is a Retired Brazilian footballer who is currently goal keeping coach at Bolívar in the Bolivian Professional Football League.

Teams
  Mariscal Braun 2001
  Bolívar 2002-2005
  SC Ulbra 2006
  Madureira 2007
  La Paz FC 2007-2008
  Real Potosí 2009-2010
  Jorge Wilstermann 2011-2012
  Aurora 2013–present

Titles
  Bolívar 2002 (Bolivian Primera División Championship), 2004 (Torneo Apertura), 2005 (Torneo Adecuación)
  Real Potosí 2009 (Playoffs Bolivian Primera División Championship)

External links
 Profile at BDFA 
 

1975 births
Living people
Footballers from Porto Alegre
Brazilian footballers
Brazilian expatriate footballers
C.D. Jorge Wilstermann players
Club Real Potosí players
Club Bolívar players
Club Aurora players
Expatriate footballers in Bolivia
Brazilian expatriate sportspeople in Bolivia
Association football goalkeepers